Yelets is the name of several inhabited localities in Russia.

Urban localities
Yelets, a city in Lipetsk Oblast; administratively incorporated as a city under oblast jurisdiction

Rural localities
Yelets, Belgorod Oblast, a khutor in Novooskolsky District of Belgorod Oblast
Yelets, Komi Republic, a village under the administrative jurisdiction of Yeletsky Urban-Type Settlement Administrative Territory of the town of republic significance of Vorkuta, Komi Republic